Electro Pioneers is the second EP by the electronic artist Space Cowboy. It contains remixes of the songs "My Egyptian Lover," "Falling Down," and "Devastated." It was released by Tiger Trax Records through Interscope Records on January 12, 2010.

Track listing

References

2010 EPs
Space Cowboy (musician) albums